The starry dragonet (Synchiropus stellatus) is a species of dragonet native to the Indian Ocean where it is found at depths of around . It occasionally is found in the aquarium trade. It grows to a length of  TL.

References

External links
 

S
Fish of South Asia
Fish of Indonesia
Fish of India
Fish of Africa
Fish of the Indian Ocean
Taxa named by J. L. B. Smith
Fish described in 1963